Agonidium nyakagerae is a species of ground beetle in the subfamily Platyninae. It was described by Basilewsky in 1988.

References

nyakagerae
Beetles described in 1988